Tasman District Council is the unitary local authority for the Tasman District of New Zealand.

The council is led by the mayor of Tasman, who is currently .

Tasman elects its 13 councillors from five different wards: three from Motueka, three from Moutere/Waimea, four from Richmond, one from Murchison and two from Golden Bay.

History

The council was formed in 1989, replacing Richmond Borough Council (1891–1989), Motueka County Council (1900–1989), Golden Bay County Council (1956–1989), and Waimea County Council (1876–1989).

After the 1989 local government reforms Tasman, Nelson City Council, Marlborough District Council and Kaikoura District Council were under the Nelson-Marlborough Regional Council. The regional council was disestablished three years later in 1992 and Tasman, Nelson and Marlborough became unitary authorities.  The regional functions for Kaikoura were transferred to the Canterbury Regional Council.

Golden Bay and Motueka wards also have community boards, each with four elected members, who work with the Council to support their local community. 

In 2020, the council had 289 staff, including 63 earning more than $100,000. According to the right-wing Taxpayers' Union think tank, residential rates averaged $3,186, and only Carterton District Council and Auckland Council had higher rates.

Committees

Council members meet each month as a full council. There are also six council committees: Regulatory, Strategy and Policy, Operations, Audit and Risk, CEO Review and Commercial.

Tasman District Council also has representatives on several joint committees with Nelson City Council: Community Development, Engineering Services, Environmental Planning, Tasman Regional Transport, Joint Shareholders Committee, the Nelson Regional Sewerage Business Unit, the Regional Pest Management Joint Committee, and the Saxton Field Committee.

The two councils also have a joint District Licensing Committee, which deals with all alcohol licensing matters.

Current councillors
The thirteen councillors for the 2019 to 2022 local government period were:
Stuart Bryant (deputy mayor), Lakes Murchison ward
Celia Butler, Golden Bay ward
Chris Hill, Golden Bay ward
Barry Dowler, Motueka ward
David Ogilvie, Motueka ward
Trindi Walker, Motueka ward
Anne Turley, Moutere/Waimea ward
Christeen Mackenzie, Moutere/Waimea ward
Dean McNamara, Moutere/Waimea ward
Kit Maling, Richmond ward
Trevor Tufnell, Richmond ward
Dana Wensley, Richmond ward
Mark Greening, Richmond ward
For 2022 to 2025 the changes are:

 Brent Maru has replaced David Ogilvie, Motueka Ward
 Mike Kininmonth and Dan Shallcrass have replaced Anne Turley and Dean McNamara, Moutere / Waimea Ward
 Glen Daikee and Jo Ellis have replaced Trevor Tufnell and Dana Wensley, Richmond Ward

References

External links
 Tasman District Council
 Top of the South Maps from Tasman District Council and Nelson City Council

Politics of the Tasman District
Territorial authorities of New Zealand
Regional councils of New Zealand
Richmond, New Zealand